Hongsan Sun clan was one of the Korean clans. Their Bon-gwan was in Buyeo County, South Chungcheong Province. According to the research in 2015, the number of Hongsan Sun clan was 951. Sun clan was born in Henan, China. King Wen of Zhou in Zhou dynasty appointed his son as Sunhu and began Sun clan. Hongsan Sun clan’s founder was born as a member of Sun clan. His name was  who was a Jinshi in Goryeo.

See also 
 Korean clan names of foreign origin

References

External links 
 

 
Korean clan names of Chinese origin